Oduya is a surname, common among the Luo ethnic group  in Kenya. Notable people with the name include:

Johnny Oduya (born 1981), Swedish ice hockey player
Fredrik Oduya (1975–2011), Swedish ice hockey player
Fredrick Oduya Oprong (1936-2019), Kenyan politician

Kenyan names